Kettle Peak is a mountain with a summit elevation of  located in the Sierra Nevada mountain range, in Mono County of northern California, United States. The summit is set in the Hoover Wilderness on land managed by Humboldt–Toiyabe National Forest, and is less than one-half mile outside the boundary of Yosemite National Park. The peak is situated approximately three miles southwest of Twin Lakes, three miles south of Victoria Peak, 2.9 miles northeast of Crown Point, and 3.1 miles northwest of Matterhorn Peak.

History
Kettle Peak is the toponym officially adopted by the U.S. Board on Geographic Names for this 11,000-foot summit, which should not be confused with another Kettle Peak (10,000 ft) located in California's Sequoia National Park. This toponym was likely applied by the United States Geological Survey during a 1905–09 survey and it appears on the first edition of the 1911 Bridgeport Quadrangle map.

The first ascent of the summit was made in August 1948 by William Dunmire and Robert L. Swift.

Climate
According to the Köppen climate classification system, Kettle Peak is located in an alpine climate zone. Most weather fronts originate in the Pacific Ocean, and travel east toward the Sierra Nevada mountains. As fronts approach, they are forced upward by the peaks, causing moisture in the form of rain or snowfall to drop onto the range (orographic lift). Precipitation runoff from this mountain drains into tributaries of Robinson Creek which is a tributary of the Walker River.

See also

 List of mountain peaks of California

Gallery

References

External links
 Weather forecast: Kettle Peak
 Kettle Peak and Maltby Lake (photo): Flickr

Mountains of Mono County, California
North American 3000 m summits
Mountains of Northern California
Sierra Nevada (United States)
Humboldt–Toiyabe National Forest